Intraflagellar transport protein 46 homolog is a protein that in humans is encoded by the IFT46 gene.

References

Further reading